Coin slot can refer to:
A coin receptacle on a vending machine
A slang term for buttock cleavage